Yosef Haim Brenner (11 September 1881 – 2 May 1921) was a Hebrew-language author from the Russian Empire, and one of the pioneers of modern Hebrew literature.

Biography

He studied at a yeshiva in Pochep, and published his first story, Pat Lechem ("A Loaf of Bread") in Ha-Melitz in 1900, followed by a collection of short stories in 1901.

In 1902, Brenner was drafted into the Russian army. Two years later, when the Russo-Japanese War broke out, he deserted. He was initially captured, but escaped to London with the help of the General Jewish Labor Bund, which he had joined as a youth.

In 1905, he met the Yiddish writer Lamed Shapiro. Brenner lived in an apartment in Whitechapel, which doubled as an office for HaMe'orer, a Hebrew periodical that he edited and published in 1906–07. In 1922, Asher Beilin published Brenner in London about this period in Brenner's life.

In 1913, Brenner married Chaya Braude, with whom he had a son, Uri.

Brenner immigrated to Palestine (then part of the Ottoman Empire) in 1909. He worked as a farmer, eager to put his Zionist ideology into practice. Unlike A. D. Gordon, however, he could not take the strain of manual labor, and soon left to devote himself to literature and teaching at the Gymnasia Herzliya in Tel Aviv. According to biographer Anita Shapira, he suffered from depression and problems of sexual identity. He was murdered in Jaffa in May 1921 during the Jaffa riots.

Zionist views
In his writing, Brenner praised the Zionist endeavor, but also contradicted himself, contending that the Land of Israel was just another diaspora and no different from other diasporas.

Writing style
Brenner was very much an "experimental" writer, both in his use of language and in literary form. With Modern Hebrew still in its infancy, Brenner improvised with an intriguing mixture of Hebrew, Aramaic, Yiddish, English and Arabic. In his attempt to portray life realistically, his work is full of emotive punctuation and ellipses. Robert Alter, in the collection Modern Hebrew Literature, writes that Brenner "had little patience for the aesthetic dimension of imaginative fictions: 'A single particle of truth,' he once said, 'is more valuable to me than all possible poetry.'" Brenner "wants the brutally depressing facts to speak for themselves, without any authorial intervention or literary heightening." This was Alter's preface to Brenner's story, "The Way Out", published in 1919, and set during Turkish and British struggles over Palestine in World War I.

Commemoration
The site of his murder on Kibbutz Galuyot street is now marked by Brenner House, a center for Hanoar Haoved Vehalomed, the youth organization of the Histadrut. Kibbutz Givat Brenner was also named for him, while kibbutz Revivim was named in honor of his magazine. The Brenner Prize, one of Israel's top literary awards, is named for him.

Published works
  A collection of 6 short stories about Jewish life in the diaspora.
 
 Yiddish: Warsaw, Literarisher Bleter, 1936.
 
 Yiddish: Berlin, Yiddisher Literarisher Ferlag, 1923.
 
 
 
 
 
 English: In Eight Great Hebrew Short Novels, New York, New American Library, 1983.
 Spanish: In Ocho Obras Maestras de la Narrativa Hebrea, Barcelona, Riopiedras, 1989.
 French: Paris, Intertextes, 1989; Paris, Noel Blandin, 1991.
 
 
 
 English: London, Cornell Univ. Press, 1971; Philadelphia, JPS, 1971; London, The Toby Press, 2004.
 Chinese: Hefei, Anhui Literature and Art Publishing House, 1998.
 
 
 English: Colorado, Westview Press, 1992.

See also
Hebrew literature

References

Further reading

 Shapira, Anita (2014). Yosef Haim Brenner: A Life. Tr. Antony Berris. Stanford. California: Stanford University Press.
Yosef Haim Brenner: A Biography (Brenner: Sippur hayim), Anita Shapira, Am Oved (in Hebrew)
 Yosef Haim Brenner: Background, David Patterson, Ariel: A Quarterly Review of Arts and Letters in Israel, vol. 33/34, 1973

External links
 Brenner's Hebrew works in Project Ben-Yehuda
 Institute for Translation of Hebrew Literature bio
 
 

1881 births
1921 deaths
Burials at Trumpeldor Cemetery
Emigrants from the Russian Empire to the Ottoman Empire
Jews in Ottoman Palestine
Jews from the Russian Empire
Modern Hebrew writers
People from Chernihiv Oblast
People from Chernigov Governorate
Ukrainian Jews